Messier 68 (also known as M68 or NGC 4590) is a globular cluster found in the east south-east of Hydra, away from its precisely equatorial part. It was discovered by Charles Messier in 1780. William Herschel described it as "a beautiful cluster of stars, extremely rich, and so compressed that most of the stars are blended together". His son John noted that it was "all clearly resolved into stars of 12th magnitude, very loose and ragged at the borders".

M68 is centred about 33,600 light-years away from Earth. It is orbiting our galaxy's galactic bulge with a great eccentricity of 0.5. This takes it to 100,000 light years from the center. It is one of the most metal-poor globular clusters, which means it has a paucity of elements other than hydrogen and helium. The cluster may be undergoing core-collapse, and it displays signs of being in rotation. The cluster may have been acquired in its gravitational tie to the Milky Way through accretion from a satellite galaxy.

As of 2015, 50 variable stars have been identified in this cluster; the first 28 being identified as early as 1919–20 by American astronomer Harlow Shapley. Most of the variables are of type RR Lyrae, or periodic variables. Six of the variables are of the SX Phoenicis variety, which display short pulsating behavior.

Gallery

See also
 List of Messier objects

References

External links
 
 Globular Cluster M68 @ SEDS Messier pages
 Messier 68, Galactic Globular Clusters Database page
 

Globular clusters
Hydra (constellation)
068
NGC objects
Astronomical objects discovered in 1780